The egg-carrying buntingi (Adrianichthys oophorus) is a species of fish in the family Adrianichthyidae.  It is endemic to Lake Poso in Sulawesi, Indonesia.

Information
The egg-carrying buntingi is known to be found in a freshwater environment within a pelagic depth range. This species is native to a tropical environment. The maximum recorded length of the egg-carrying buntingi as an unsexed male is about 8.5 centimeters or about 3.34 inches. The most common recorded length for this species as an unsexed male is about 6.5 centimeters or about 2.55 inches. This species is distributed in the areas of Asia or Indonesia. The eggs of this species are carried between the pelvic fins, and each egg is attached to the body by filaments. The egg-carrying buntingi can be specifically found in the Lake Poso in central Sulawesi. This species has the ability to live in an aquarium as long as it is a freshwater aquarium.

Male and female egg-carrying buntingi can be distinguished by the size of their pelvic fins. Females usually have longer pelvic fins because they are the offspring carriers. Recent studies have shown that egg-carrying buntingi tend to reproduce during rainy seasons because it causes the lake level to rise.

References

Notes
 

egg-carrying buntingi
Taxa named by Maurice Kottelat
Taxonomy articles created by Polbot
egg-carrying buntingi
Taxobox binomials not recognized by IUCN